Jettatore is a 1919 German silent crime film directed by Richard Eichberg and starring Aenderly Lebius, Lee Parry and Bruno Decarli.

The film's sets were designed by the art director Willi Herrmann.

Cast
 Aenderly Lebius as Sir Percy Haig 
 Lee Parry
 Bruno Decarli as Baron Gaston de Saint Amant 
 Violetta Napierska as Fedja - eine junge Zigeunerin 
 Karl Halden as Graf Altavilla 
 Emil Rameau as Fürst Jellinow 
 Oscar Sabo as Prologue speaker

References

Bibliography
 Alfred Krautz. International directory of cinematographers, set- and costume designers in film, Volume 4. Saur, 1984.

External links

1919 films
Films of the Weimar Republic
Films directed by Richard Eichberg
German silent feature films
German black-and-white films
German crime drama films
1919 crime drama films
Silent drama films
1910s German films